The following highways are numbered 70:

International
 Asian Highway 70
 European route E70
 Arab Mashreq route M70

Australia
 Peak Downs Highway - Queensland State Route 70 (Regional)
 Sunshine Motorway - Queensland State Route 70 (Sunshine Coast)
 Sparks Road

Brazil
 BR-070

Canada
 Newfoundland and Labrador Route 70
  Quebec Autoroute 70

China 
  G70 Expressway

Croatia
 D70 road (Croatia)

Germany
 Bundesautobahn 70
 Bundesstraße 70

India

Ireland
 N70 road (Ireland)

Israel
 Highway 70 (Israel)

Hungary
 M70 motorway (Hungary)

Jordan

Korea, South
Gukjido 70

New Zealand
 Inland Kaikōura Road

Norway
 Norwegian National Road 70

Philippines
 N70 highway (Philippines)

Spain
 Autovía A-70
 Autovía CV-70

South Africa
 R70 road (South Africa)

United Kingdom
 A70 road

United States
 Interstate 70
 Interstate 70N (Maryland) (former proposal)
 Interstate 70S (District of Columbia–Maryland) (former proposal)
 Interstate 70S (Pennsylvania) (former)
 U.S. Route 70
 Alabama State Route 70
 California State Route 70
Colorado State Highway 70 (1923-1968) (former)
 Connecticut Route 70
 Florida State Road 70
 Georgia State Route 70
 Georgia State Route 70 (1932–1941) (former)
 Illinois Route 70
 Indiana State Road 70
 Iowa Highway 70
 K-70 (Kansas highway) (former)
 Kentucky Route 70
 Louisiana Highway 70
 Maryland Route 70
Maryland Route 70B (former)
Maryland Route 70C
 Massachusetts Route 70
 M-70 (Michigan highway) (former)
 Minnesota State Highway 70
 County Road 70 (Dakota County, Minnesota)
 County Road 70 (Hennepin County, Minnesota)
Missouri Route 70 (1922) (former)
 Nebraska Highway 70
 Nevada State Route 70 (former)
 New Jersey Route 70
 County Route 70 (Bergen County, New Jersey)
 New York State Route 70
 County Route 70 (Chautauqua County, New York)
 County Route 70 (Dutchess County, New York)
 County Route 70 (Livingston County, New York)
 County Route 70 (Madison County, New York)
 County Route 70 (Oneida County, New York)
 County Route 70 (Orleans County, New York)
 County Route 70 (Putnam County, New York)
 County Route 70 (Saratoga County, New York)
 County Route 70 (Suffolk County, New York)
 County Route 70 (Warren County, New York)
 North Carolina Highway 70 (former)
 Ohio State Route 70 (1923) (former)
 Oklahoma State Highway 70B
 Oklahoma State Highway 70C
 Oklahoma State Highway 70D
 Oklahoma State Highway 70E
 Oklahoma State Highway 70F
 Oregon Route 70
 Pennsylvania Route 70 (former)
 South Carolina Highway 70
 Tennessee State Route 70
 Texas State Highway 70
 Texas State Highway Loop 70
 Farm to Market Road 70
 Texas Park Road 70
 Utah State Route 70 (1931-1977) (former)
 Virginia State Route 70
 Wisconsin Highway 70
 West Virginia Route 70 (1920s) (former)
 Wyoming Highway 70

Territories
 U.S. Virgin Islands Highway 70

See also 
 List of highways numbered 70A
 A70 (disambiguation)